Starting in May 2022, postal workers in the United Kingdom undertook a series of strikes and industrial disputes. They principally involved members of Unite and the Communication Workers Union (CWU) at both Royal Mail and the Post Office.

Background
The United Kingdom saw an increase in industrial action in 2022. This came during the cost of living crisis, and after high inflation, stagnant wage growth and the effects of the COVID-19 pandemic.

Post Office strikes
CWU members went on a one day strike on 3 May over pay; members had their wages frozen for 2021 and were offered a 2% increase plus a £250 one-off payment for 2022. The CWU said the offer was "exceptionally poor" given that Retail Price Index inflation had reached 9%. The Post Office maintained that "the vast majority" of branches would remain unaffected. Around 3,500 members were involved in the dispute.

Workers went on strike again on Saturday 4 June during the Platinum Jubilee of Elizabeth II, after the Post Office had made a pay offer of a 2.5% plus a £500 payment. The CWU said all 114 crown post offices (those managed directly by Post Office Ltd) would close for the day and that action by supply-chain workers would mean that there would be no cash collections or deliveries to post offices on Monday 6 June.

A third strike day was organised for 11 July after members rejected a pay plan with a 3% rise and £500 payment. Andy Furey, the CWU assistant secretary, said that the Post Office's offers continued to represent a "massive real-terms pay cut". Supply-chain staff also went on strike on 14 July, affecting collections and deliveries at thousands of post offices.

The CWU announced the fourth round of strikes on 12 August to be held on 26, 27 and 30 August - with all members striking on 26 August to coincide with the Royal Mail action the same day, crown office workers striking on 27 August, and supply-chain staff striking on 30 August.

Royal Mail strikes

On 29 June 2022, Royal Mail managers in Unite voted to approve strike action and industrial action short of a strike over job cuts and a redeployment programme which the union claimed would result in "worsening terms and conditions". In England, Wales and Scotland, 86% of members voted to strike and 91% for action short of a strike. In Northern Ireland, 89% voted to strike and 88% for action short of a strike. The action included around 2,400 managers across over 1,000 delivery offices.

The CWU announced a second ballot on 20 July over Royal Mail's proposed job restructuring. Royal Mail said it would consider splitting its postal business from its more profitable international logistics operations if unions would not accept the restructuring plan, noting that it was losing up to £1 million per day. The CWU criticised Royal Mail for "pleading poverty" despite having posted a full-year operating profit of £758 million two months before.

On 17 August, CWU announced that members at Royal Mail had voted by 98.7% for further strike days over terms and conditions (adding to the separate dispute over pay) on a 72% turnout. The CWU later announced the first round of strikes to be held on 26 and 31 August, and 8-9 September respectively.

On 7 September, the CWU said that its members had rejected a 5.5% pay offer and supported another two day strike on 30 September and 1 October. CWU action planned for 9 September (as the second half of a 48-hour strike) was cancelled after the death of Elizabeth II "out of respect for her service to the country and her family".

On 22 September, Royal Mail wrote to the CWU proposing that talks should be taken to Acas, the industrial relations arbitration body, after five months of negotiations and three dispute resolution procedures had not resulted in any agreement.

On 27 September, the CWU announced 93.5% of members had again voted to continue strike action, and said it was planning 19 further days of strikes across October and November to cover peak periods such as Black Friday, Cyber Monday and the buildup to Christmas.

CWU members at Royal Mail once again walked out on 13 October, causing no letters to be delivered and parcel delivery to be disrupted. Another strike day was held on 20 October, and again on 25 October.

New pay deal offered and Christmas strikes 
On 31 October, Royal Mail CEO Simon Thompson announced a new 18-month 9% pay deal to postal workers, stating that this was the "best and final offer" that the company could afford. General Secretary of the CWU Dave Ward responded by accusing Royal Mail of "imposing change not negotiating" whilst announcing that the CWU would call off most of the November strikes up until Black Friday, so that it could consult its members on the deal. This began a period of negotiation between Royal Mail and the CWU which lasted for much of the month.

On 17 November, the CWU formally rejected the pay deal, stating that the "livelihoods of postal workers were at stake" and announced that the strike days over Black Friday would go ahead, as well as additional strike days on 9, 11, 14, 15, 23 and 24 December respectively. The Christmas strikes resulted in severe delays to mail across the UK.

Response
Bright Green reported in August 2022 that 53% of the public saw industrial action by postal workers as justified, compared to 32% who saw it as unjustified.

During the Conservative Party leadership election in July 2022, Liz Truss proposed legislation to increase restrictions on strikes in certain industries, including the postal sector. These plans included increasing the ballot threshold from 40% to 50%, increasing the minimum notice period for strikes from two weeks to four, and introducing a cooling-off period to limit the amount a union could conduct industrial action. Although Truss won the leadership election and the Transport Strikes (Minimum Service Levels) Bill was introduced on 20 October 2022, the bill did not include the postal sector and Truss resigned on 21 October after a government crisis.

References

2022 labor disputes and strikes
2023 labor disputes and strikes
Postal workers strikes
Postal workers strikes
Postal workers strikes
Royal Mail
Unite the Union
Boris Johnson
Liz Truss
Rishi Sunak
Postal strikes